Kawasaki Motors Racing was the European subsidiary of Kawasaki Heavy Industries, located in the Netherlands. It was responsible for managing the racing activities of the MotoGP team.

The subsidiary was established in 2007 as a result of the Japanese manufacturer's necessary split from Harald Eckl's organisation, who managed the Kawasaki MotoGP team since 2002. The reason for the split was Eckl's involvement with a competitor's MotoGP activities, which forced Kawasaki to terminate the relationship immediately. For the first time since Kawasaki returned to the premier class of motorcycle racing, the team became a complete ‘in house’ factory team.

On January 9, 2009, Kawasaki announced it had decided to "... suspend its MotoGP racing activities from 2009 season onward and reallocate management resources more efficiently". The company stated that it will continue racing activities using mass-produced motorcycles as well as supporting general race oriented consumers.

The emphasis was subsequently placed on World Superbike Championship racing using the Kawasaki ZX-10R road bike as a basis, with Paul Bird Motorsport (2009-2011) and Provec Racing, based in Granollers, Barcelona Province, Spain from 2012, together with World Supersport 300 from 2019 to 2021.

Racing background

2007 MotoGP season
The team used the new 800cc Ninja ZX-RR and Bridgestone tyres in 2007. Randy de Puniet and Olivier Jacque were chosen as team riders.

Olivier Jacque crashed in practice during the Chinese Grand Prix, gashing his arm severely enough to be unable to race for 2 Grands Prix. He returned to racing only to crash again during practice at the Catalan Grand Prix, missing this race too. Following the series of injuries, Jacque announced his retirement from competition, but planned to continue as a team test rider. He was replaced by Australian rider Anthony West.

The team's best result for the season was a 2nd-place finish by Randy de Puniet at a wet Japanese Grand Prix.

2008 MotoGP season

For 2008 John Hopkins joined the team alongside Anthony West. Results were poor though, being regular midfield runners throughout the season.

In August 2008, Kawasaki signed Marco Melandri to join John Hopkins for the 2009 season. However, the global financial crisis of 2008 caused Kawasaki to reconsider its MotoGP program, and the Italian sports daily Tuttosport reported on December 30 that Kawasaki would be pulling out of MotoGP for 2009.

2009 MotoGP season

After negotiations with DORNA, Kawasaki provided a scaled down team named Hayate Racing Team for the 2009 season. The team was renamed due to limited factory involvement, with Kawasaki providing only one bike with Marco Melandri as the sole rider.

The team achieved better than expected results with 6th and 5th placings early in the season. Melandri finished in 2nd place at the French Grand Prix. This result is equal to Kawasaki's best ever result in MotoGP and is their first podium finish since 2007.

MotoGP results
(key) (Races in bold indicate pole position; races in italics indicate fastest lap)

World Superbike Championship

(key) (Races in bold indicate pole position; races in italics indicate fastest lap)

* Season still in progress.

References

Motorcycle racing teams
Motorsport in Japan
Kawasaki Heavy Industries
Motorcycle racing teams established in 2007
2007 establishments in Japan
Motorcycle racing teams disestablished in 2009
2009 disestablishments in Japan